St. Michael the Archangel's Church may refer to:

 St. Michael the Archangel Church, Bishkek
 St Michael the Archangel's Church, Booton
 St. Michael the Archangel's Parish (Bridgeport, Connecticut)
 St Michael the Archangel's Church, Halam
 St. Michael the Archangel Church, Kaunas
 St Michael the Archangel's Church, Laxton
 St Michael the Archangel's Church, Retford
 Church of the Holy Archangel Michael, Kokshetau